Asota fulvia is a moth of the family Erebidae first described by Edward Donovan in 1805. It is found in Indonesia.

The wingspan is about 60 mm.

References

Asota (moth)
Moths described in 1805
Moths of Indonesia